The 1904–05 Columbia men's ice hockey season was the 9th season of play for the program.

Season
The team did not have a head coach but E. H. Updike served as team manager.

Note: Columbia University adopted the Lion as its mascot in 1910.

Roster

Standings

Schedule and results

|-
!colspan=12 style=";" | Regular Season

References

Columbia Lions men's ice hockey seasons
Columbia
Columbia
Columbia
Columbia